Geomatics is defined in the ISO/TC 211 series of standards as the "discipline concerned with the collection, distribution, storage, analysis, processing, presentation of geographic data or geographic information". Under another definition, it consists of products, services and tools involved in the collection, integration and management of geographic (geospatial) data. It is also known as geomatic(s) engineering (geodesy and geoinformatics engineering or geospatial engineering). Surveying engineering was the widely used name for geomatic(s) engineering in the past.

History and etymology 

The term was proposed in French ("géomatique") at the end of the 1960s by scientist Bernard Dubuisson to reflect at the time recent changes in the jobs of surveyor and photogrammetrist. The term was first employed in a French Ministry of Public Works memorandum dated 1 June 1971 instituting a "standing committee of geomatics" in the government.

The term was popularised in English by French-Canadian surveyor Michel Paradis in his The little Geodesist that could article, in 1981 and in a keynote address at the centennial congress of the Canadian Institute of Surveying (now known as the Canadian Institute of Geomatics) in April 1982. He claimed that at the end of the 20th century the needs for geographical information would reach a scope without precedent in history and that, in order to address these needs, it was necessary to integrate in a new discipline both the traditional disciplines of land surveying and the new tools and techniques of data capture, manipulation, storage and diffusion.

Geomatics includes the tools and techniques used in land surveying, remote sensing, cartography, geographic information systems (GIS), global navigation satellite systems (GPS, GLONASS, Galileo, BeiDou), photogrammetry, geophysics, geography, and related forms of earth mapping. The term was originally used in Canada but has since been adopted by the International Organization for Standardization, the Royal Institution of Chartered Surveyors, and many other international authorities, although some (especially in the United States) have shown a preference for the term geospatial technology, which may be defined as synonym of "geospatial information and communications technology".

Although many definitions of geomatics, such as the above, appear to encompass the entire discipline relating to geographic information – including geodesy, geographic information systems, remote sensing, satellite navigation, and cartography –, the term is almost exclusively restricted to the perspective of surveying and engineering toward geographic information. Geoinformatics has been proposed as an alternative comprehensive term, but its use is only common in some parts of the world, especially Europe.

The related field of hydrogeomatics or hydrospatial covers the area associated with surveying work carried out on, above or below the surface of the sea or other areas of water. The older term of hydrographics was considered too specific to the preparation of marine charts, and failed to include the broader concept of positioning or measurements in all marine environments.geospatial data and information include hydrospatial data and information. Hydrospatial is all about the blue of our blue planet and its contiguous zones

A growing number of university departments which were once titled "surveying", "survey engineering" or "topographic science" have re-titled themselves using the terms "geomatics" or "geomatics engineering", while others have switched to program titles such as "spatial information technology", and similar names.

The rapid progress and increased visibility of geomatics since the 1990s has been made possible by advances in computer hardware, computer science, and software engineering, as well as by airborne and space observation remote-sensing technologies.

Science  

Geospatial science or spatial information science is an academic discipline incorporating fields such as surveying, geographic information systems, remote sensing, and cartography. Spatial science is typically concerned with the measurement, management, analysis and display of spatial information describing the Earth, its physical features and the design environment.

The term spatial science or spatial sciences is primarily used in Australia.
Australian universities which offer degrees in spatial science include Curtin University, the University of Tasmania, the University of Adelaide,Melbourne University and RMIT University.

In the U.S., Texas A&M University offers a bachelor's degree in Spatial Sciences and is home to its own Spatial Sciences Laboratory. Beginning in 2012, the University of Southern California started to place more emphasis on the spatial science branch of its geography department, with traditional human and physical geography courses and concentrations either not being offered on a regular basis or phased out. In place, the university now offers graduate programs strictly related to spatial science and its geography department offers a spatial science minor rather than the original geography major.

Spatial information practitioners within the Asia-Pacific region are represented by the professional body called the Surveying and Spatial Sciences Institute (SSSI).

Engineering  

Geomatic(s) Engineering, Geodesy and Geoinformatics Engineering or Geospatial Engineering is a rapidly developing engineering discipline that focuses on spatial information (i.e. information that has a location). The location is the primary factor used to integrate a very wide range of data for spatial analysis and visualization. Geomatics engineers apply engineering principles to spatial information and implement relational data structures involving measurement sciences, thus using geomatics and acting as spatial information engineers. Geomatics engineers manage local, regional, national and global spatial data infrastructures. Geomatics Engineering also involves aspects of Computer Engineering, Software Engineering and Civil Engineering.

Geomatics is a field that incorporates several others such as the older field of land surveying engineering along with many other aspects of spatial data management ranging from data science and cartography to geography. Following the advanced developments in digital data processing, the nature of the tasks required of the professional land surveyor has evolved significantly in recent years, and for more and more people the term "surveying" no longer accurately covers the whole range of tasks that the profession deals with. As our societies become more complex, information with a spatial position associated with it becomes more critical to decision-making, both from a personal and a business perspective, and also from a community and a large-scale governmental viewpoint.

Therefore, the geomatics engineer can be involved in an extremely wide variety of information gathering activities and applications. Geomatics engineers design, develop, and operate systems for collecting and analyzing spatial information about the land, the oceans, natural resources, and manmade features.

The more traditional land surveying strand of geomatics engineering is concerned with the determination and recording of boundaries and areas of real property parcels, and the preparation and interpretation of legal land descriptions.  The tasks more closely related to civil engineering include the design and layout of public infrastructure and urban subdivisions, and mapping and control surveys for construction projects.

Geomatics engineers serve society by collecting, monitoring, archiving, and maintaining diverse spatial data infrastructures. Geomatics engineers utilize a wide range of technologically advanced tools such as digital theodolite/distance meter total stations, Global Positioning System (GPS) equipment, digital aerial imagery (both satellite and air-borne), and computer-based geographic information systems (GIS). These tools enable the geomatics engineer to gather, process, analyze, visualize and manage spatially related information to solve a wide range of technical and societal problems.

Geomatics engineering is the field of activity that integrates the acquisition, processing, analysis, display and management of spatial information. It is an exciting and new grouping of subjects in the spatial and environmental information sciences with a broad range of employment opportunities as well as offering challenging pure and applied research problems in a vast range of interdisciplinary fields.

In different schools and in different countries the same education curriculum is administered with the name surveying in some, and in others with the names geomatics, civil engineering surveying, geomatics engineering, geospatial (information) engineering, surveying engineering, or geodesy and geoinformatics. While these occupations were at one time often taught in civil engineering education programs, more and more universities include the departments relevant for geo-data sciences under informatics, computer science or applied mathematics. These facts demonstrate the breadth, depth and scope of the highly interdisciplinary nature of geomatics engineering.
The job of geospatial engineer is well established in the U.S. military.

Applications 
Application areas include: 
Aeromagnetic surveys
Airborne geophysics
Air navigation services
Archaeological excavation and survey for GIS applications
Coastal zone management and mapping
Disaster informatics for disaster risk reduction and response
The environment
Infrastructure management
Land management and reform
Natural resource monitoring and development
Seismic Interpretation
Subdivision planning
Urban and regional planning
Oceanography
Meteorology
Parks
Resource Management
Climate Change/Environmental Monitoring

Areas of knowledge
Geomatics integrates science and technology from both new and traditional disciplines:
Geodesy
Geodynamics
Global positioning system (GPS) or global navigation satellite system (GNSS)
Surveying (including land, cadastral, aerial, mining and engineering surveying)
Hydrography
Navigation
Location-based services
Cartography and digital mapping
Geographic information systems (GIS), spatial database management and geographic information technology (GeoIT)
Spatial analysis, spatial data mining and knowledge discovery, and spatial statistics
Computer-aided design (CAD) and scientific visualization
Geovisualization, Geovisual Analytics, Visual communication design, graphic design and multimedia technology
Remote sensing
Digital Earth
Image processing
Photogrammetry 
Computer vision
Land information systems (LIS) 
Land management, cadastre, real property law
Applications programming
Project management
Geoinformatics
Land Surveying
LIDAR
Digital terrain modelling

See also

References

Further reading
Geomatics Canada Ottawa: Natural Resources Canada ISSN 1491-5480

 Yvan Bédard, "Geomatics" in Karen Kemp (2008), Encyclopedia of Geographic Information Science, Sage. 
 Yvan Bédard (2007),“Geomatics”: 26 years of history already!, Geomatica, 61(3):269-272. 

 "Geomatics", Chap. 1 in Mario A. Gomarasca (2009) Basics of Geomatics, Springer.
 "Geomatics", sec. 1.3 in Mathias Lemmens (2011), Geo-information: Technologies, Applications and the Environment, Springer.

External links

International Master's Program Geomatics at Karlsruhe University of Applied Sciences
Namibia's Geomatics Program
Bachelor of Science in Geomatics  at Nicholls State University
Geomatics program at the University of Florida
Canada's Northwest Territories Centre for Geomatics 
UK's Environment Agency Geomatics Group
GIM International Lemmer, the Netherlands: Geodetical Information & Trading Centre ISSN 1566-9076
  Géomètres sans Frontières : Association de géometres pour aide au développement.

 School of Rural and Surveying Engineering at National Technical University of Athens (MEng)

Geographical technology
 
Science and technology
Geographic data and information fields of study
Geodesy